Aishwarya Nigam (born 4 July 1989) is an Indian singer. He is best known as a playback singer in Hindi films, particularly for films like Dabangg. He has received several awards for the song "Munni Badnaam Hui" from Dabangg.

Early and family life 
He was born in Muzaffarpur, Bihar. His mother Arti Ranjan works as lecturer in Mukherjee Seminary, Muzaffarpur while his father Mukesh Ranjan is a manager in Punjab National Bank. He has done his schooling from Sun Shine Prep High School, Muzaffarpur.

Nigam has lived his childhood in New Colony Sherpur, Muzaffarpur, Bihar. Nigam is married to singer and Indian idol 1 fame Deepali Sahay who is also a singer.

Career 
Aishwarya Nigam has participated in the Music competition Sa Re Ga Ma Pa Ek Main Aur Ek Tu 2006 for Zee TV. Nigam and Ujjaini Mukherjee were declared the winners on 24 June 2006. Nigam was one of the contestants of Jo Jeeta Wohi Superstar, a singing competition on Star Plus channel. He represented the Champions team. He was eliminated on 25 April 2008. Aishwarya was one of the contestants of music competition show IPL Rockstar on Colors TV channel. He was among the top three finalists of IPL Rockstar. He is much inspired from Sonu Nigam: that made him keep title as "Nigam".

He sang the title track of Kitani Mohabbat Hai for seasons I and II, a daily soap on NDTV imagine. He has worked with renowned music directors like Lalit Pandit, Anu Malik, Pritam, Sajid-Wajid, Shameer Tandon. He sang a song for the serial Dill Mill Gayye.

Aishwarya is fondly known for singing the famous item song "Munni Badnaam Hui" from Salman Khan starer Dabangg. He has sung "Maara re Sixer Maara Re Four" from the movie Ferrari Ki Sawaari, a movie by Vidhu Vinod Chopra. The Hit Item number "Tere Mohalle" from the movie "Besharam" starring Ranbir Kapoor is also sung by Aishwarya Nigam.

Discography

Film songs
Following are the list of songs that Aishwarya Nigam has sung for various Indian Movies

Non-film songs

Television
Following are the list of Reality Shows that Aishwarya Nigam has done.

Accolades

See also
List of Indian playback singers

References

External links 

 
 Official website

Living people
Indian male playback singers
Bollywood playback singers
1989 births
People from Muzaffarpur